People's List for the Constitution (LdP) is a left-wing and anti-corruption electoral list founded by Antonio Ingroia and Giulietto Chiesa in November 2017 to run in the Italian general election on 4 March 2018.

Election results

Italian Parliament

References

Political parties established in 2017
2017 establishments in Italy
Electoral lists